Diarmuid Ua Duibhne, also known as Diarmuid of the Love Spot, was a demigod, son of Donn and one of the Fianna in the Fenian Cycle of Irish mythology (traditionally set in the 2nd to 4th century). He is best known as the lover of Gráinne, the intended wife of Fianna leader Fionn mac Cumhaill in the legend The Pursuit of Diarmuid and Gráinne. Among his sons were Donnchadh, Iollann, Ruchladh and Ioruad.

In the legend, the Tuatha Dé Danann god of love and creativity Aenghus Óg was Diarmuid's foster father and protector. According to the story, Diarmuid was a skilled warrior and a well-liked and valued member of the Fianna who single-handedly killed 3,400 warriors in a battle, saving Fionn and the Fianna.

Legend

Famous weapons
Aengus Óg owned a deadly sword named Móralltach or Nóralltach – the Great Fury, given to him by the sea-god Manannán mac Lir (Mananaan Son of the Sea). In The Pursuit of Diarmuid and Gráinne it is said of Móralltach that it left no stroke nor blow unfinished at the first trial. Aonghus gave this sword to his foster-son Diarmuid, in addition to a sword named Beagalltach, the Little Fury. Along with these two swords, Diarmuid is known to have wielded two spears, Gáe Buidhe (Yellow Spear) and Gáe Dearg (Red Spear), which inflicted wounds that could not be healed. He used Gáe Dearg and Moralltach for adventures which were matters of life and death, and Gáe Buidhe and Beagalltach for lesser battles.

Vicious curse
Diarmuid's father, Donn, was a warrior of the Fianna. At a dinner party, Donn, jealous of the attention given to the son of Aengus' steward, killed the steward's son, Congus, when no one was looking. Aengus resurrected the steward's son in the form of a boar, but the steward required Fionn to find out the truth and, upon learning the truth, put a curse upon Diarmuid: He was to be killed by the boar, the steward's transformed son.

Magical love spot
Diarmuid was famous for his beauty, and for his 'love spot', which made him irresistible to women. While hunting one night he met a woman who was the personification of youth. After sleeping with him she put a magical love spot under his eye that caused any woman who looked at it to fall in love with him.

Loathly Lady and Cup
One freezing winter's night, a 'Loathly Lady' entered the Fianna lodge where the warriors had just gone to bed after a hunting expedition. Drenched to the bone, her sodden hair was snarled and knotted. She knelt beside each warrior and demanded a blanket, beginning with Fionn. Only young Diarmuid, whose bed was nearest to the fireplace, took pity on the woman, giving her his bed and blanket. She noticed Diarmuid's love spot and said that she had wandered the world alone for seven years. Diarmuid told her she could sleep all night and he would protect her. Towards dawn, she became a beautiful young woman.

The next day, she rewarded Diarmuid's kindness by offering him his greatest wish—a house overlooking the sea. Overjoyed, Diarmuid asked the woman to live with him. She agreed on one condition: He must promise never to mention how ugly she looked on the night they met. After three days together, Diarmuid grew restless. She offered to watch his hound and her new pups while Diarmuid went hunting. On three occasions, Diarmuid's friends, envious of his luck, visited the lady and asked for one of the new pups. Each time, she honoured the request. Each time, Diarmuid was angry and asked her how she could repay him so meanly when he overlooked her ugliness the first night they met. On the third mention, the woman and house disappeared, and his beloved greyhound died.

Realizing that his ungratefulness has caused him to lose everything he valued, Diarmuid sets out to find his lady. He used an enchanted ship to cross a stormy sea to the Otherworld, where he searched for the lady through meadows filled with brightly coloured horses and silver trees. Three times he saw a drop of blood; he gathered each drop into his handkerchief. When a stranger revealed that the King's gravely ill daughter had just returned after seven years, Diarmuid realised it must be his lady. Rushing to her side, he discovered she was dying. The three drops of blood Diarmuid collected were from her heart, spilled each time she thought of Diarmuid. The only cure was a cup of healing water from the Plain of Wonder, guarded by a jealous king and his army. Diarmuid vowed to bring back the cup.

At an impassable river, Diarmuid was helped by the Red Man of All Knowledge, who had red hair and eyes like glowing coals. He helped Diarmuid to cross the river and guided him to the king of the healing cup's country. Diarmuid called out that the cup should be sent out from the king's castle to him, or else champions to fight with him should be sent out. Twice eight hundred fighting men were sent out, and in three hours there was not one of them left to stand against him. Then twice nine hundred better fighters were sent out against him, and within four hours there was not one of them left. The king gave him the cup of healing. On the return trip, the Red Man advised Diarmuid on how to heal his lady. He also warned the hero that when her sickness ended, Diarmuid's love for her would end as well.

Having cured his lover, Diarmuid boarded an enchanted ship to return to the Fianna, where he was greeted by his friends and his greyhound, which the lady had returned to life as her final gift to him.

Diarmuid and Gráinne
Tóraigheacht Dhiarmada agus Ghráinne – in English "The Pursuit of Díarmuid and Gráinne" is a popular romance of a love triangle. Although the surviving text of The Pursuit of Díarmait and Gráinne is dated no earlier than the 17th century, there is a reference to this tale in the late 12th-century manuscript The Book of Leinster.

Fionn Mac Cumhaill, much older than in his other adventures, had several wives over the years. When his last wife died, his son Oisín and his companions one day asked Fionn when he would remarry. Diorruing suggested that the best woman for Fionn would be Gráinne, daughter of Cormac Mac Art, the high king of Ireland.

Gráinne thought that she would be marrying Fionn's son Oisín or grandson Oscar, not the aging Fionn himself. Disappointed to find that her fiancé was old enough to be her grandfather, she determined not to marry Fionn, but to run away with one of the champions of the Fianna.

Grainne administered drugs into the wine of the guests save for Oisín, Oscar, Diarmuid, Caílte and Diorruing. She approached Oisín, who refused her request, then she approached Diarmuid. Diarmuid also objected to her advances because Fionn was a friend and his leader. Grainne imposed a geis on Diarmuid that he must follow her. His friends were saddened, knowing that Diarmuid would die if he came between Fionn and his desired wife. Diarmuid left the palace, knowing that despite being a friend and follower of Fionn, his leader would hunt him down for the betrayal.

When Fionn Mac Cumhaill woke, he sent Clan O'Navnan to track down the fleeing couple. Diarmuid and Gráinne crossed Ath Luain (Athlone), and hid in the Wood of Two Tents. Diarmuid's friends Oisín, Oscar, Caílte and Diorruing were troubled by Fionn's behaviour and determined to secretly help Diarmuid whenever they could.

In the Wood of Two Tents, Diarmuid had erected a fence around him and Gráinne with seven doorways leading to different directions in the wood. Fionn told his followers to surround and capture Diarmuid. Each of them offered to let the lovers through, but Diarmuid refused to allow them to compromise their honour by doing so. Aengus, Diarmuid's foster father and protector, wanted to help him, but Diarmuid insisted that he would leave on his own. Aengus took Gráinne away to the Wood of Two Sallows, and Diarmuid escaped by using his spear to vault over the fence and escaped into the wood.

In the centre of the Forest of Dubros were magical berries from the rowan tree that could restore the youth of an old person, guarded by the giant Searbhan on the instructions of the Tuatha Dé Danann. Diarmuid and Gráinne asked Searbhan if they could live and hunt game in the forest. Searbhan agreed on the condition that they would not eat the berries. Gráinne asked to eat the berries. Searbhan refused and attacked Diarmuid with his massive club. Diarmuid used Searbhan's own weapon to kill him.

Fionn gathered the Fianna and travelled to the wood where he had a fidchell board set up, and played his son Oisín. Oscar and Cailte assisted Oisín in the game, since no one except Diarmuid was a match against Fionn in this game. Diarmuid watched the game from above, and couldn't resist aiding Oisín in the game by tossing berries at the pieces. Fionn lost three straight matches to his son. Fionn realised that the couple were hiding in the tree and ordered men to kill his rival. Diarmuid killed seven warriors named Garbh. Oscar, Fionn's grandson, warned that anyone who harmed Diarmuid would face his anger, and escorted the couple safely away through the forest.

Fionn went to the Land of Promise to ask his old nurse Bodhmall to kill Diarmuid. Diarmuid was hunting in the forest beside the river Boyne and Bodhmall flew through the air on a flying water-lily and hurled poisoned darts that could penetrate his shield and armour. Diarmuid suffered agony where the darts struck him; he killed her with the Gáe Dearg.

Fionn pardoned Diarmuid after Aonghus Óg interceded on the couple's behalf; Diarmuid and Gráinne lived in peace at Ceis Chorainn in Sligo for several years. They had five children, four sons and a daughter. Diarmuid built a fort, Rath Gráinia. However, they went for years without visiting Grainne's father Cormac Mac Art and Diarmuid's former comrades. Gráinne persuaded Diarmuid to invite their friends and relations to a feast, including Fionn and the Fianna. Fionn invited Diarmuid on a boar hunt on the heath of Benn Gulbain; Diarmuid only took his short sword Beagalltach and his yellow spear, Gáe Buide, not his best weapons. He was gored by a giant boar which had already killed a number of men and hounds.

Water drunk from Fionn's hands had the power of healing, but when Fionn gathered water, he twice let it run through his fingers before he could bring it to Diarmuid. Threatened by his son Oisín and grandson Oscar, he fetched water a third time, but this time he was too late: Diarmuid had died.

After Diarmuid's death, Aengus took his body back to the Brugh, where he breathed life into it whenever he wished to speak with the hero.

Tóraigheacht Dhiarmada agus Ghráinne has often been compared with the earlier love triangle between Deirdre, Noísi and King Conchobar of Ulster, Longes mac nUislenn (The Exile of the Sons of Uisliu), which is part of the Ulster Cycle.

Diarmuid Ua Duibhne is said to be the founder of the Scottish Clan Campbell. On the Campbell crest is a boar's head, a reference to Diarmuid's geis and death.

In popular culture
A crater on Europa is named after Diarmuid with many others also named after Celtic figures.

The Digimon Diarbbitmon is named after Diarmuid Ua Duibhne (the bbit coming from rabbit, as the Digimon is a rabbit) with its swords also being named Moralltach and Beagalltach.

References 

Fenian Cycle
Deaths due to boar attacks
Mythological swordfighters
Pigs in literature